The Iveco Stralis is a heavy-duty truck produced by the Italian manufacturer Iveco between 2002-2019. The Stralis replaced the EuroStar and EuroTech models; it covers the range above the Eurocargo, between 19 and 44 tonnes. The fire version of the Stralis released with the German based Iveco Magirus.

In 2007, the Stralis received minor changes to cabin and front of the vehicle. All models have the EuroTronic gearbox, which have full or semiautomatic modes. The original Stralis, introduced in 2002, was the first heavy truck
with an automated gearbox as standard equipment.
The Stralis got 2014 a Facelift.

All engines are four-valve straight-6 with modern pump nozzle injection.

Different performance levels from three different capacity variants are available:
 Cursor 8, 7.8 L capacity: 228-265 KW (310-360 PS)
 Cursor 10, 10.3 L capacity: 309-331 KW (420-450 PS)
 Cursor 13, 12.9 L capacity: 368-412 KW (500-560 PS)

All engines are equipped with a high performance decompression exhaust brake known as Iveco Turbobrake.

Notes

External links 
stralis.iveco.com

Vehicles introduced in 2002
Stralis
Cab over vehicles
Tractor units